David Paul Boreanaz ( born May 16, 1969) is an American actor, television producer, and director known for playing the roles of vampire-turned-private investigator Angel on The WB/UPN Buffy the Vampire Slayer supernatural drama (1997–2003) and its spinoff Angel (1999–2004); FBI Special Agent Seeley Booth, a homicide investigator, on the Fox television crime procedural comedy-drama series Bones (2005–2017); and United States Navy SEAL  Master Chief Special Warfare Operator Jason Hayes in the CBS/Paramount+ military drama series SEAL Team (2017–present).

Early life
David Paul Boreanaz was born in Buffalo, New York, where his father, Dave Roberts (born David Thomas Boreanaz), was working as a weather forecaster and children's show (Rocketship 7) host as Dave Thomas, for ABC affiliate WKBW-TV. His mother, Patti Boreanaz, was a travel agent. He has two older siblings, Bo and Beth. He is of Italian and Slovenian descent on his father's side (the surname Boreanaz is of Slovenian origin). His mother is of half Slovak and part Irish, German, French, and Swiss descent.

When Boreanaz was seven years old, the family moved to the Philadelphia, Pennsylvania, area after his father took a job at WPVI-TV, the ABC affiliate in Philadelphia. Boreanaz was raised Catholic and attended Rosemont School of the Holy Child at Rosemont, Pennsylvania and then high school at Malvern Preparatory School in Malvern, Pennsylvania, where he was a keen athlete and played on the school football team. He graduated from Ithaca College in Ithaca, New York, in 1991 with a degree in cinema and photography.

Career
Boreanaz moved to Los Angeles with a degree in filmmaking, but found it hard to gain work initially like many other struggling actors. Boreanaz slept on a couch at his sister's place, visiting film sets and doing production assistant work in order to learn more about the industry he hoped to be more involved with. He was a background extra in the 1993 movie Aspen Extreme as a fan waving at skiers. He also prepared props for Best of the Best II (also released in 1993), which stars Eric Roberts, where he also had a small uncredited role; Boreanaz is seen briefly standing to the left, as the characters Tommy Lee and Alex enter a nightclub (which is a front for an illegal fighting ring).

Boreanaz's first paid acting appearance was a 1993 guest spot on the American sitcom Married... with Children, as Kelly's unfaithful biker boyfriend, who gets pummeled by her father, Al. He was cast in the television series Buffy the Vampire Slayer, after being suggested for the role to Marti Noxon by one of Boreanaz's neighbors, after he was seen walking his dog past their house on a regular basis.  In the cult series, he played the mysterious Angel, a vampire cursed by Romani people with a soul as punishment for his murdering a Romani girl, initially resulting in debilitating remorse and then a life of contrition. The show became enormously successful and Boreanaz starred in a spin-off series, Angel, which gave the character a chance to evolve and concentrated on Angel's battle for redemption for the numerous murders he committed before he regained his soul. He appeared on Buffy from 1997 to 1999, at which point he began starring in Angel, which ran until 2004, with a recurring role on Buffy after his departure. He also appeared in the film Macabre Pair of Shorts where he plays a vampire's victim (in the segment "MPS").

Boreanaz's only starring role in a major theatrical film was in 2001's slasher horror film Valentine, alongside Denise Richards and Katherine Heigl. In 2002, he had a supporting role in a movie titled I'm with Lucy. In 2003, he appeared in the music video for singer Dido's hit single "White Flag", and was the voice of Leon (Squall Leonhart) in the video game Kingdom Hearts, but did not reprise his role in the sequel.

In 2005, Boreanaz began starring opposite Emily Deschanel on the prime time television series Bones. He also appeared in These Girls, a Canadian film in which he played a biker; the film received a limited theatrical release in Canada in March 2006, after premiering at the Toronto International Film Festival and the Vancouver International Film Festival. He has also starred in the independent films Mr. Fix It and Suffering Man's Charity (released on DVD as Ghost Writer), as well as the direct-to-DVD sequel The Crow: Wicked Prayer in which he starred alongside Tara Reid. In 2006, he starred in another DVD release, The Hard Easy, which also starred Steve Buscemi, Vera Farmiga and Nick Lachey.

In that same year, he also voiced Hal Jordan in the direct-to-video DC Comics animated feature Justice League: The New Frontier. In the season three finale of his TV series Bones, Boreanaz's character Seeley Booth is seen in his bathtub reading an issue of Green Lantern, the character he voiced in that feature. As well as being a producer on Bones since its third season, Boreanaz also directed at least one episode every season since Season 4. BuddyTV ranked him No. 13 on its "TV's 100 Sexiest Men of 2010" list and No. 18 in 2011.

In the 2011 movie The Mighty Macs, Boreanaz played the role of Ed T. Rush, NBA referee and husband of Immaculata basketball coach Cathy Rush. In 2013, Boreanaz starred in the miniseries Full Circle as Jace Cooper. The same year, Boreanaz starred in the independently made fantasy drama Officer Down as Detective Les Scanlon. Boreanaz has also appeared on American Dad! as Seeley Booth in the episode "Less Money, Mo' Problems", on Family Guy as himself in the episode "Road to the North Pole", and in the Baby Blues episode "Teddy-Cam" as the voice of Johnny.

On March 22, 2017, Boreanaz joined the cast of a CBS drama project based on the United States Navy SEALs. The project received a series order on May 12, 2017, and became known as SEAL Team, which premiered on September 27, 2017.

Personal life

Boreanaz was married to Ingrid Quinn from 1997 to 1999. He wed Playboy model Jaime Bergman on November 24, 2001.  They have a son, born May 1, 2002, and a daughter, born August 31, 2009.

In 2004, Boreanaz underwent reconstructive surgery on the anterior cruciate ligament of his left knee, a result of a running injury he suffered in high school that was not fully corrected at that time. His recovery did not prevent Angel production from continuing, but did limit his mobility and physical activities in several episodes, including his directorial debut, "Soul Purpose".

In 2010, Boreanaz admitted to having an extramarital affair with Rachel Uchitel, the same woman with whom Tiger Woods was alleged to have cheated on his wife. Boreanaz has claimed that Uchitel tried to blackmail him. At the time of Boreanaz's affair, his wife was pregnant.

In 2013, Boreanaz, his wife and their friends Melissa and Aaron Ravo started the nail polish line Chrome Girl. The two wives run the day-to-day operations while their husbands help with the overall business. Boreanaz was involved with the creation of the NHL colors line and supports them publicly, while Aaron, who works in advertising, has helped out with PR work and marketing.

Boreanaz is a hockey fan and an avid supporter of the Philadelphia Flyers.
Boreanaz has a friendship with his former Bones co-star Emily Deschanel.

A female co-worker on the set of Bones sued him in 2010 for sexual harassment stating he repeatedly attempted to kiss and fondle her. In March 2011, the woman's attorney requested the lawsuit be dismissed stating the matter was resolved.

Filmography

Film

Television

Video games

Music video

References

External links

 
 
 
 
 Cover story from Smoke Magazine (Spring, 2008)
 Bullz-Eye.com interview (November 1, 2006)
 the Globe & Mail interview (October 10, 2005)
 MovieHole interview (May 13, 2004)
 David Boreanaz Gallery and Interview
 Official website in Spanish

Living people
Male actors from Buffalo, New York
Male actors from Pennsylvania
American male film actors
American male television actors
American male video game actors
American male voice actors
American television directors
American people of Italian descent
American people of Slovenian descent
Ithaca College alumni
People from Delaware County, Pennsylvania
Male actors from Philadelphia
Television producers from New York (state)
Television producers from Pennsylvania
20th-century American male actors
21st-century American male actors
Malvern Preparatory School alumni
1969 births